Stowmarket Town Council is the first tier of local government for Stowmarket in Suffolk.

History
Formed in 1974 from the former Stowmarket Urban District Council, the Town Council serves a population of approximately 20,000 people in four wards. It is made up of 16 elected members backed up by a staff of over 30.

Its meetings usually take place on the first and third Wednesdays of the month in the historic John Milton Room, Milton House.

The Town Council has six standing Committees which are:
Audit & Governance Committee;
Business Improvement Committee;
Operations & Strategy Committee;
Personnel Committee;
Planning & Development Committee; and
Regal Theatre Committee.

Current Councillors

Barry Salmon (Town Mayor) - Labour Party
Nick Gowrley (Deputy Town Mayor) - Conservative Party
Oliver Amorowson - Green 
Linda Baxter - Green
Gerard Brewster - Independent
Terence Carter - Green
David Child - Liberal Democrat
Maria Child - Liberal Democrat
Paul Ekpenyong - Conservative Party
Will Howman - Labour Party  
Barry Humphreys MBE - Conservative Party
Lesley Mayes - Conservative Party
Dave Muller - Conservative Party
Miles Row - Green
Heather Salmon - Labour Party
Keith Scarff - Liberal Democrat

List of Former Town Mayors

 R.W. Hiron 1974
 E. Jones 1974–1975
 R.J. Pattle 1975–1976
 Mrs. R.P. Jones 1976–1977
 C.G. Soames MBE 1977–1978
 G. M. Brewster 1978–1979
 P. Olfield 1979–1980
 F.H. Brooke 1980–1981
 D. H. Hopgood 1981–1982
 E.E.J. Nunn 1982–1983
 G.A.J. Paton 1983–1984
 W. Wright 1984–1985
 R.J. Pattle 1985–1986
 Mrs R.P. Jones 1986–1987
 D.H.P. Perry 1987–1988
 Mrs J.M. Cade 1988–1989
 J.E. Shaw 1989–1990
 E. Jones 1990–1991
 Mrs E.A. Shaw 1991–1992
 E.E.J. Nunn 1992–1993
 W.F. Crane 1993–1994
 R. D. Snell 1994–1995
 G.A.J. Paton 1995–1996
 Mrs M.S. Finbow 1996–1997
 Mrs C.M. Burgess 1997–1998
 Mrs H. Salmon 1998–1999
 R.D. Snell 1999–2000
 Mrs M.S. Finbow 2000–2001
 J.A. Drake 2001–2002
 K.E. Scarff 2002–2003
 B.J. Salmon 2003–2004
 G.A.J. Paton 2004–2005
 Mrs L.M. Mayes 2005–2006
 Mrs P.J.E. Robinson 2006–2007
 F. Whittle 2007–2008
 Mrs A.E.J. Whybrow 2008–2009
 Mrs V I Waspe 2009–2010
 Mrs P. J. E. Robinson 2010–2011
 Mrs D. Ball 2011–2012
 Mrs A.E.J. Whybrow 2012–2013
 Mrs V.I. Waspe 2013–2014
 G.M. Brewster 2014–2015
 B.J. Salmon 2015–2016
 Maj. B. Humphreys MBE 2016–2017
 D. J. Muller 2017–2018
 Mrs L. Baxter 2018–2019
 P. Ekpenyong 2019–2021
 K.E. Scarff 2021-2022
 B.J. Salmon 2022-present

References

Parish councils of England
Local authorities in Suffolk
Town Council